C process control refers to a group of functions in the standard library of the C programming language implementing basic process control operations. The process control operations include actions such as termination of the program with various levels of cleanup, running an external command interpreter or accessing the list of the environment operations.

Overview of functions

The process control functions are defined in the stdlib.h header (cstdlib header in C++).

References

External links

C standard library